Cambodian usually refers to:
 Something of, from, or related to the country of Cambodia
 Cambodian people (or Khmer people)
 Cambodian language (or Khmer language)
 For citizens and nationals of Cambodia, see Demographics of Cambodia
 For languages spoken in Cambodia, see Languages of Cambodia
Cambodian may also refer to:

Other
 Cambodian architecture
 Cambodian cinema
 Cambodian culture
 Cambodian cuisine
 Cambodian French
 Cambodian literature
 Cambodian music
 Cambodian name
 Cambodian nationalism
 Cambodian descendants worldwide:
 Cambodian Americans
 Cambodian Australians
 Cambodian Canadians
 Cambodians in France

See also 
 
List of Cambodians

Language and nationality disambiguation pages